Ashesh Prosad Mitra FNA, FASc, FRS (21 February 1927 – 3 September 2007) was a physicist who headed the National Physics Laboratory in Delhi, India and was the Director General of the Council of Scientific and Industrial Research (CSIR). He is primarily known for his work on environmental physics.

Life
Mitra studied at the Bangabasi College, an affiliated college of the University of Calcutta. He completed his post graduation studies from the renowned Rajabazar Science College campus of same university.

He was the director of the National Physical Laboratory (NPL) from 1982 to 1986 and the Director General of the Council of Scientific and Industrial Research (CSIR) from 1986 to 1991.

He died at New Delhi in September 2007.

Research
Radio & Space Physics was his area of specialization. He performed major work in the field of earth's near-space environment, through group based and space techniques. He worked on cosmic radio noise for studying the upper atmosphere led to a series of discoveries in ionosphere, solar physics and cosmic rays.

Honours and awards
He was awarded the Shanti Swarup Bhatnagar Prize for Physical Science in 1968. The citation read: 
Foreign Fellow of Bangladesh Academy of Sciences
Awarded the Padma Bhushan in 1987
Fellow of the Royal Society of London in 1988.
President of the International Union of Radio Sciences - URSI between 1984-1987
Member, General Committee of International Council of Scientific Unions between 1984-1988
Fellow - Indian National Science Academy in 1961
Fellow of the Indian Academy Sciences in 1974
Fellow of the Thud World Academy of Sciences in 198
President, National Academy of Sciences between 1992-1993
Honorary President, URSI in 2002
Jawahar La1 Nehru Fellowship between 1978-1980
Shanti Swarup Bhatnagar Fellowship between 1991-1996
Senior Homi Bhabha Fellowshp between 1996-1998
Shanti Swarup Bhatnagar Memorial Award for Physical Sciences in 1968
C. V. Raman Award of University Grants Commission in 1982
Om Prakash Bhasin Award for Physical Physical Sciences in 1987
FICCI Award for Physical Sciences in 1982
Meghnad Saha Golden Jubilee Award of Indian Association of Science in 1991
Modi Science Award in 1992
Vasuic Award on Environmental Science and Technology in 2002
Meghnad Saha Medal by Asiatic Society in 1994
S. K. Mitra Centenary Medal by Indian Science Congress Association in 1995
DSc (Honors Causa) degrees from the universities of Manipur, Kolkata, Jadavpur, Burdwan North Bangal, Vidhyasagar.

Personal life
Ashesh Prosad Mitra had two daughters with his wife, Sunanda, whom he married on 12 August 1956.

References

1927 births
2007 deaths
Scientists from Kolkata
Bangabasi College alumni
University of Calcutta alumni
20th-century Indian physicists
20th-century Indian educators
Fellows of the Royal Society
Council of Scientific and Industrial Research
Recipients of the Padma Bhushan in science & engineering
Fellows of Bangladesh Academy of Sciences